Alexander Ivanovich Tarasov (known under the pseudonym T-Killah, born 30 April 1989) is a Russian hip-hop, R&B, rap artist and music producer.

Early life 
Tarasov was born in Moscow.

Career 
In 2019, he started working with Mia Boyka.

Personal life 
In 2017 his father died of a stroke. In 2019, he married journalist Maria Belova.

At the end of 2022, the couple announced that after three years of marriage they were expecting their first child, the star couple shared this news on their Instagram.

References 

1989 births
Living people
Rappers from Moscow
Russian pop musicians
21st-century Russian singers